Bradbury Hospice is a hospice with 26 beds located in Sha Tin, Hong Kong. It is under the New Territories East Cluster managed by the Hospital Authority.

History
Bradbury Hospice was found by the Society for the Promotion of Hospice Care and is the first independent hospice in Hong Kong. It was started building in 1990 on land in Sha Tin granted by the Government of Hong Kong, and was named after the Bradbury Charitable Trust, which donated HK$24 million to the building of the hospice. Other principal donors include the Royal Hong Kong Jockey Club and the Keswick Foundation. The 26-bed hospice started its operations in June 1992 and was officially opened on 7 November that year by Charles, Prince of Wales.

On 1 April 1995, the management of the hospice was transferred to the Hospital Authority.

Services
, the hospital had 26 beds and around 57 members of staff.

References

External links

Hospitals in Hong Kong
Hospitals established in 1992
1992 establishments in Hong Kong